The Raleigh mayoral election of 2009 was held on 6 October 2009 to elect a Mayor of Raleigh, North Carolina.  It was won by incumbent Charles Meeker, who defeated Larry D. Hudson, II in the first-round primary.  Because Meeker won more than 50% in the first round, there was no need for a run-off.

It was officially a non-partisan contest, but Meeker had won four previous elections as a Democrat.

Results

Footnotes

2009
Raleigh
Raleigh mayoral